Howard's Rock is a large piece of quartzite that is displayed in Clemson University's Memorial Stadium. The rock is the center of a longstanding tradition where players touch it before running down the hill in the east end zone at each home football game.

History

The rock was brought to football coach Frank Howard in the early 1960s as a gift from Samuel C. Jones. Jones found the rock while driving through Death Valley, California and gave it to Howard as a reference to "Death Valley," the name used to refer to Memorial Stadium. The coach used the rock as a doorstop until 1966. He was cleaning out his office when he told Gene Willimon, a Clemson booster, "Take this rock and throw it over the fence or out in the ditch...Do something with it, but get it out of my office." It was Willimon who had the rock placed on a pedestal in the east end zone, where it remains today.

The rock made its first appearance on September 24, 1966: Clemson was losing to Virginia by 18 points with seventeen minutes left in the game. The Tigers made up the deficit and won the game 40-35. The next season was when the tradition of rubbing the rock upon entering the stadium began. Howard reportedly said to his players, "If you're going to give me 110 percent, you can rub that rock. If you're not, keep your filthy hands off of it."

The Tigers have continued this tradition since 1967, except for two-and-a-half seasons between 1970 and 1972. This was due to new head coach Hootie Ingram's changing the team's entrance to the west end zone after Frank Howard's retirement. During those seasons, Clemson held a bad record at home of 6-9. Before the South Carolina rivalry game in 1972, the team voted to enter via the east end zone and run down the hill. They later won the game 7-6.

Vandalism

On June 2, 2013 Howard's Rock was vandalized. The case the Rock was held in was broken into and a large portion of the rock was broken off. 
Three men have been arrested in this ongoing investigation; ESPN reported that “the charges being pressed on him are felony malicious injury to animals or personal property valued at more than $2,000 but less than $10,000 and misdemeanor trespassing." The charges were subsequently upgraded. The damage to the rock was re-evaluated to more than $10,000.  Clemson University police later stated that the surveillance video from the outside of Memorial Stadium shows that three people got out of the truck used in the act.  Two more people have been arrested and released on a bond of $7,500.

Micah Rogers was accused vandalizing and stealing a portion of Howard's Rock in Memorial Stadium. A jury found Rogers guilty of malicious damage, but they found him not guilty of grand larceny. The judge gave Rogers the maximum sentence of 30 days in jail or a $1,000 fine for the malicious damage charge; however, the sentence was suspended, meaning Rogers does not have to serve the jail time, so long as he pays a $750 fine and completes 25 days of supervised community service.

Two other men later pleaded guilty to attempting to cover up the vandalism of Howard's Rock that took place in June 2013. Michael J. Rogers, 49, and Alden J. Gainey, 20, pleaded guilty to the misdemeanor charge of giving false information to police for their involvement in attempting to cover up vandalism of Howard’s Rock at Clemson University. Micah Rogers, Michael Rogers' son, was previously convicted of malicious injury to property in the case. Michael Rogers had a meeting June 20, 2013 at his home in North Carolina with Micah Rogers, Gainey, and Xavia Wynn to discuss video surveillance of Micah’s truck and the three boys in the vicinity of Howard's Rock the night the vandalism occurred.

References

Rocks
Clemson Tigers